The 29th edition of the annual Hypo-Meeting took place on 31 May and 1 June 2003 in Götzis, Austria. The track and field competition, featuring a decathlon (men) and a heptathlon (women) event, was part of the 2003 IAAF World Combined Events Challenge.

Men's decathlon

Schedule

31 May

1 June

Records

Results

Women's heptathlon

Schedule

31 May

1 June

Records

Results

Notes

See also
2003 Decathlon Year Ranking
Athletics at the 2003 Pan American Games – Men's decathlon
Athletics at the 2003 Pan American Games – Women's heptathlon
Athletics at the 2003 Summer Universiade – Men's decathlon
2003 World Championships in Athletics – Men's decathlon
2003 World Championships in Athletics – Women's heptathlon

References
 decathlon2000
 IAAF results
 athledunet

2003
Hypo-Meeting
Hypo-Meeting